Jakub Čech (born August 13, 1985) is a Czech professional ice hockey goaltender. He is currently a free agent having last played for HC Příbram of the Czech 2.liga.

Čech made his Czech Extraliga debut playing with AZ Havířov during the 2001-02 Czech Extraliga season.

References

External links

1985 births
Living people
Czech ice hockey goaltenders
Ducs de Dijon players
ETC Crimmitschau players
HC Havířov players
Sportovní Klub Kadaň players
Stadion Hradec Králové players
MHC Martin players
Motor České Budějovice players
Orli Znojmo players
Piráti Chomutov players
KH Sanok players
Sault Ste. Marie Greyhounds players
Sportspeople from Olomouc
HC Tábor players
HC RT Torax Poruba players
PSG Berani Zlín players
Czech expatriate ice hockey players in Slovakia
Czech expatriate ice hockey players in Canada
Czech expatriate ice hockey players in Germany
Czech expatriate sportspeople in Poland
Czech expatriate sportspeople in France
Expatriate ice hockey players in France
Expatriate ice hockey players in Poland